Ethnic pornography is a genre of pornography featuring performers of specific ethnic groups, or depictions of interracial sexual activity. Productions can feature any type of ethnic group, such as White, Asian, Middle Eastern, Latino, Black, or Native American.

Demographics
According to a 2019 study published in Archives of Sexual Behavior, the most common form of interracial pornography involves white men paired with either Asian, Latina, or Black women. In terms of "most watched" videos, the most common form was white men with Latina women. Interracial videos involving black and white individuals were equally distributed across gender pairings, at 15.1%. White women were present in 37.2% of all videos (including non-interracial pornography), while White male actors were present in 55.2% of all videos.

Interracial pornography in the United States 
Interracial pornography features performers of differing racial and ethnic backgrounds and often employs ethnic and racial stereotypes in its depiction of performers. American stag films dated to the 1930s depict acts between black and white performers: Di Lauro and Rabin point to The Handy Man, The Hypnotist, and A Stiff Game, the last of which identifies its only male character as "Sambo".

Behind the Green Door (1972) was one of the first pornographic films to feature sex between a white actress (Marilyn Chambers) and a black actor (Johnnie Keyes).

In the past, some of American pornography's white actresses were allegedly warned to avoid African American males, both on-screen and in their personal lives. One rationale was the purportedly widespread belief that appearing in interracial pornography would ruin a white performer's career, although some observers have said that there is no evidence that this is true. Adult Video News critic Sheldon Ranz wrote in 1997 that:

On the other hand, some commentators have pointed out that the lack of racial divide and "nonsense about 'attraction' and 'preference'" in the European pornographic scene allowed many top European female performers to appear in American interracial pornographic films. Lexington Steele told The Root in a 2013 interview that white female performers who appear in interracial pornography may conceal their careers due to social pressure from their intimates, arguing "It's just an element of American culture that still exists, and that is the feeling that a white female will be deflowered or soiled, if you will, by doing a scene with a black male". According to a survey by Jon Millward, while 87% of porn actresses are willing to take a facial, only 53% will do interracial porn.

Alleged role of agents
Sophie Dee, prominent figure of the genre, said in a 2010 interview that she thought agents often pressure white female performers not to appear in interracial pornography. Dee said that they will be paid better for performing with black men and their careers will not be damaged in any way, pointing at positive examples of some Vivid Entertainment actresses.

Aurora Snow noted in a 2013 article that the major factor preventing several white actresses from doing interracial scenes is "career anxiety" imposed by agents rather than their own racial bias. Tee Reel, male porn star and one of the few black agents in the U.S. industry, had a concurring opinion, saying, "In the business, some girls who say they don't do interracial, I've actually had sex with, off-camera." Porn star Kristina Rose has alleged that some agents tell younger actresses that they will earn less from performing in interracial pornography to bar their involvement, although the opposite is true on a global level.

Scholarly criticism

In Chapter 3 of her book Porn Studies, Linda Williams, professor at the University of California, Berkeley, examines the film Crossing the Color Line starring Sean Michaels, a black actor, and Christi Lake, a white actress. In the interviews portion of the film, Michaels and Lake express how being "color-blind" is a progressive approach to interracial porn. Williams identifies a contradiction between these interviews and the subsequent performance, in which both actors make several references to the differences in skin color between them. For example, Lake refers to Michaels' genitalia as a "big black dick". Williams argues that by pointing out racial differences, race is being made the main point of intrigue for the audience, which perpetuates the exotification of racial differences. She argues that the eroticized sexual tension in interracial pornography dates back in American history to slavery.

Mireille Miller-Young, professor of feminist studies at University of California, Santa Barbara, argues that while the porn industry hypersexualizes African-American pornographic actresses, they are often paid less, hired less, and given less attention during health checks than their white counterparts. Some scholars also argue that white women are upheld as the most-prized commodity in the industry, while black women are often devalued for their sex work, regardless of their perceived erotic abilities.

See also

 Asian fetish
 Cuckold fetish
 Miscegenation
 Misogynoir
 Pornography by region
 Racial fetishism

References

External links

 American Porn
 Mireille Miller-Young, Hardcore Desire: Black Women Laboring in Porn 

 
Ethnic and racial stereotypes
Multiracial affairs